Agimat ng Agila (International title: The Eagle’s Quest / is a Philippine television drama fantasy series broadcast by GMA Network. Directed by Rico Gutierrez, it stars Bong Revilla. It premiered on May 1, 2021 on the network's Sabado Star Power sa Gabi line up replacing Catch Me Out Philippines. The series concluded on May 7, 2022 with a total of 2 seasons and 27 episodes. It was replaced by Jose & Maria's Bonggang Villa in its timeslot.

The series is streaming online on YouTube.

Cast and characters

Lead cast
 Bong Revilla as Gabriel Labrador

Supporting cast
 Sanya Lopez as Maya Lagman (season 1, guest season 2)
 Elizabeth Oropesa as Roberta "Berta" Lagman
 Roi Vinzon as Alejandro Dominguez (season 1)
 Benjie Paras as Wesley Dimanahan
 Allen Dizon as Gerry Flores (season 1, guest season 2)
 Michelle Dee as Serpenta
 Edgar Allan Guzman as Julian (season 1)
 Miggs Cuaderno as Bidoy (season 1)
 Ian Ignacio as Malvar (season 1)
 Rabiya Mateo as Agent Natasha "Asha" Raj (season 2)
Gardo Versoza as Zeus Limjoco (season 2)
Betong Sumaya as Sergeant Arthuro "Art" de Mesa (season 2)
Allan Paule as Mang Simo (season 2)
Kim de Leon as Jumong (season 2)
Lia Salvador as Sharmaine (season 2)
Shermaine Santiago as Carol Llamanzares (season 2)
 Rafael Rosell as Valerio Mariano (season 2)
 MJ Lastimosa as Rosebud / Garote (season 2)

Guest cast
 Sheryl Cruz as Myrna Labrador
 Yuan Francisco as Wacky Labrador

Production
Principal photography commenced in February 2020. It was halted in March 2020 due to the enhanced community quarantine in Luzon caused by the COVID-19 pandemic. Filming was continued on December 5, 2020 in Tanay and Antipolo, Rizal.

Ratings
According to AGB Nielsen Philippines' Nationwide Urban Television Audience Measurement People in television homes, the pilot episode of Agimat ng Agila earned a 16.3% rating. While the season one finale scored a 14.7% rating. The series finale gathered an 11.5% rating.

References

External links
 
 

2021 Philippine television series debuts
2022 Philippine television series endings
Fantaserye and telefantasya
Filipino-language television shows
GMA Network drama series
Television productions postponed due to the COVID-19 pandemic
Television shows set in the Philippines